The 1995/96 NTFL season was the 75th season of the Northern Territory Football League (NTFL).

St Marys had completed a perfect season back to back to set a record of success. The Saints have claimed there 21st premiership title defeating Southern Districts in the grand final by 16 points.

Grand Final

References

Northern Territory Football League seasons
NTFL